Dharmasena is a surname. Notable people with the surname include: 

 Kumar Dharmasena (born 1971), Sri Lankan cricketer and umpire
 Samararatne Dharmasena (1950–2007), Sri Lankan sprinter
 Suranjith Dharmasena (born 1965), Sri Lankan cricketer
 W. H. M. Dharmasena (born 1955), Sri Lankan politician

Sinhalese surnames